José Julián de la Fuente (born 14 September 1903, date of death unknown) was a Uruguayan fencer. He competed in the individual and team sabre events at the 1936 Summer Olympics.

References

External links
 

1903 births
Year of death missing
Sportspeople from Montevideo
Uruguayan male sabre fencers
Olympic fencers of Uruguay
Fencers at the 1936 Summer Olympics